Denys Woods (12 March 1920 – 10 October 1972) was a South African cricketer. He played in twenty-one first-class matches for Border from 1946/47 to 1953/54.

See also
 List of Border representative cricketers

References

External links
 

1920 births
1972 deaths
South African cricketers
Border cricketers